Habbus bin Maksen al-Muzaffar, of the Zirid dynasty, was ruler of the Taifa of Granada from 1019 to 1038. 
He was the successor to his uncle Zawi ben Ziri. His first Vizier was Samuel ibn Naghrillah, the renowned Jewish scholar and politician. Under his rule, the prestige of the taifa was greatly increased, and he carried out military campaigns against neighbor states, increasing Granada's territory. The Jewish population in the city increased to 5,000, and Lucena flourished as a Jewish scholarly site.

He had two sons, Badis and Buluggin, and was succeeded by Badis.

Sources

Ibn Khaldun (trans. William MacGuckin Slane), Histoire des Berbères et des dynasties musulmanes de l'Afrique septentrionale, vol. 2, Imprimerie du Gouvernement, 1854, 635 p.
Rafael Halperin The Golden and the destruction age of Spanish Jewry.

Zirid kings of Granada
1038 deaths
11th-century rulers in Al-Andalus
Year of birth unknown
11th-century Berber people